Edelaraudtee (Southwestern railway) is an Estonian railway operator founded in 1997.  AS Edelaraudtee operates freight services on lines from Tallinn to Rapla, Pärnu & Viljandi owned by Edelaraudtee Infrastruktuuri AS.

Until 2014, the company operated the domestic inter-city passenger routes currently operated by Elron.

Before the transfer of the passenger traffic, the company employed around 500 staff and carried approximately 1.8 m passengers a year.

Operations

On 16 March 2012 Edelaraudtee launched a new information display solution based on GPS, that provided passengers via Internet and physical displays real-time information on the trains’ locations. The developed information project, whose part is that solution, had an objective to provide passengers necessary opportunities to acquire trip information. Edelaraudtee had plans to equip all serviced train stations and stops with QR codes to link passengers with relevant station’s or train stop’s information display on the Internet.

Rolling stock
Freight operations are handled by Czech-built ChME3 diesel shunters, while passenger services were provided by around twenty DR1A/B diesel multiple units.

Delivery of 18 electric and 20 diesel Stadler FLIRT trains built by Stadler Rail started in 2012 and by June 2014 all trains had arrived to Estonia. Since 2014, all services are operated by Elron using the new trains.

See also
 Tallinn-Tapa railway

References

External links

 

Railway companies of Estonia
1997 establishments in Estonia
Railway companies established in 1997